Mildella is a genus of ferns in the subfamily Cheilanthoideae of the family Pteridaceae. Species are native to Mexico, Central America and the Caribbean.

Species
The Pteridophyte Phylogeny Group classification of 2016 (PPG I) placed seven species in the genus, although recognizing that the genus was then not monophyletic, since the New and Old World species belonged in different clades. , the Checklist of Ferns and Lycophytes of the World placed only two New World species in the genus:
Mildella fallax (M.Martens & Galeotti) G.L.Nesom
Mildella intramarginalis (Kaulf. ex Link) Trevis.

The Checklist of Ferns and Lycophytes of the World placed former Mildella species in the genus Oeosporangium:
Mildella henryi (Christ) C.C.Hall & Lellinger = Oeosporangium nitidulum
Mildella mairei (Brause) C.C.Hall & Lellinger = Oeosporangium mairei
Mildella nitidula (Wall. ex Hook.) C.C. Hall & Lellinger = Oeosporangium nitidulum
Mildella paupercula (Christ) C.C.Hall & Lellinger = Oeosporangium pauperculum
Mildella smithii (C.Chr.) C.C.Hall & Lellinger = Oeosporangium smithii
Mildella straminea (Ching) C.C.Hall & Lellinger = Oeosporangium stramineum

References

Pteridaceae
Fern genera
Taxa named by Vittore Benedetto Antonio Trevisan de Saint-Léon